Burlesque is a classic musical or theatrical entertainment of parodic humour.

Burlesque may also refer to:
 American burlesque, a form of variety show popular from the 1860s
 Neo-Burlesque, a revival and updating of the traditional American burlesque performance
 Burlesque (play), by George Manker Watters and Arthur Hopkins, filmed as The Dance of Life
 Victorian burlesque, an imitative work that derives humour from an incongruous contrast between style and subject

Film
 Burlesque (2010 American film), starring Christina Aguilera and Cher
 Burlesque (2010 Australian film), a 2010 drama film

Music
 Burlesque (Bellowhead album)
 Burlesque (compilation album), a 2007 compilation album of contemporary burlesque and neo-burlesque performers
 Burlesque (soundtrack), a soundtrack album by Cher and Christina Aguilera from the 2010 film of the same name
 Burlesque: Allegro con brio - Presto, the 4th movement of Violin Concerto No. 1 by Dmitri Shostakovich
 Burlesque (song), a 1972 single by Family from the Bandstand album

See also
 Burleske, a composition by Richard Strauss